"Six Days on the Road" is an American song written by Earl Green and Muscle Shoals Sound Studio songwriter Carl Montgomery, made famous by country music singer Dave Dudley. The song was initially recorded by Paul Davis (not the same as the better known singer-songwriter, full name Paul Lavon Davis) and released in 1961 on the Bulletin label. In 1963, the song became a major hit when released by Dudley, peaking at #2 on the Billboard Hot Country Songs chart and cracking the Top 40 (#32) on the Hot 100, leading to it being hailed as the definitive celebration of the American truck driver.

In 1997, more than 30 years after Dudley's version charted, country music band Sawyer Brown took the song back to the Hot Country Songs chart, reaching #13.

Dave Dudley version
According to country music historian Bill Malone, "Six Days on the Road" was not the first truck driving song; Malone credits "Truck Driver's Blues" by Cliff Bruner, released in 1940, with that distinction. "Nor is it necessarily the best," said Malone, citing songs such as "Truck Drivin' Man" by Terry Fell and "White Line Fever" by Merle Haggard and the Strangers as songs that "would certainly rival it".

However, "Six Days", Malone continued, "set off a vogue for such songs" that continued for many years. "The trucking songs coincided with country music's growing identification as working man's music in the 1960s," he said. Many country music artists and bands—including Alabama, Dick Curless, Merle Haggard, Kathy Mattea, Ronnie Milsap, The Howboy Catts, Jerry Reed, Del Reeves, Dan Seals, Red Simpson, Red Sovine, Joe Stampley, C.W. McCall, Steve Earle, among many others—recorded successful truck driving songs during the next 25 years. Several of those artists—Dudley included—became almost exclusively associated with songs about truck drivers and life on the road.

Dudley "strikingly captures the sense of boredom, danger and swaggering masculinity that often accompanies long-distance truck driving. His macho interpretation, with its rock-and-roll overtones, is perfect for the song."

Allmusic writer Bill Dahl, called "Six Days" the "ultimate overworked rig driver's lament;" indeed, the song's lyrics bemoan highway patrolmen, scale weigh-ins and loneliness for the narrator's girlfriend, and speak of using "little white pills" to keep him awake. Like Malone, Dahl also cited Dudley's voice as perfect for the song, as "his bottomless pipes were certainly the ultimate vehicle for its delivery, reeking of too much turbid coffee and too many non-filtered cigarettes."

Dudley's version was also played during the STS-3 mission as a wake-up call.

Chart performance
Released in mid-May 1963, "Six Days on the Road" became Dudley's first major hit, reaching #2 on the Billboard Hot Country Singles chart that summer. The record spent 21 weeks on this chart, and it also became a minor hit on Top 40 radio stations, peaking at #32 on the Billboard Hot 100. It was also listed at #13 on their easy listening survey.

Many truck-driving themed hits followed for Dudley, including "Last Day in the Mines," "Truck Drivin' Son-of-a-Gun" and "Truck Driver's Prayer."

Sawyer Brown version

Sawyer Brown included the song on their 1997 album Six Days on the Road. Their version peaked at #13 on the country charts that year. They changed the line "I'm taking little white pills" to "I'm passing little white lines", thus omitting the drug reference.

Chart performance

Year-end charts

Other versions
Others who have recorded "Six Days" include Taj Mahal,Charley Pride, Del Reeves, The Youngbloods, George Jones, Red Simpson, Nev Nicholls, Ferlin Husky, Boxcar Willie, Wolfman Jack, Motorpsycho, Red Sovine, Jim Croce, Steve Earle, George Thorogood, Michael Nesmith, the Flying Burrito Brothers, who are shown performing the song live in the movie Gimme Shelter, as well as Gram Parsons and the Fallen Angels, blues guitarist Popa Chubby (for his 2008 album Vicious Country), New Riders of the Purple Sage and Tom Petty's band Mudcrutch. According to Dahl, one of the best versions was a blues-rocking rendition recorded in 1969 by Taj Mahal.

"Six Tons of Toys"
Dudley recorded a re-written Christmas version entitled "Six Tons of Toys" on his 1982 album Trucker's Christmas. This was covered by Paul Brandt on his 1997 album A Paul Brandt Christmas: Shall I Play for You?.

References

Further reading
Whitburn, Joel, "Top Country Songs: 1944-2005," 2006.

1961 songs
1963 singles
1987 singles
1997 singles
Dave Dudley songs
Sawyer Brown songs
Steve Earle songs
Johnny Rivers songs
George Thorogood songs
Jim Croce songs
Music videos directed by Michael Salomon
Songs about truck driving